Brickellia cordifolia is a North American species of flowering plants in the family Asteraceae. It is native to southeastern United States in the states of Florida, Georgia, and Alabama. Common names are Flyr's nemesis or Flyr's brickellbush.

Brickellia cordifolia is a perennial herb up to 150 cm (60 inches) tall. It produces many small flower heads with pale yellow-green disc florets but no ray florets. It grows in most pine and oak woodlands at low elevations.

References

External links
Calphotos photos gallery, University of California

cordifolia
Flora of the Southeastern United States
Plants described in 1823
Flora without expected TNC conservation status